Esquimalt is a municipality in British Columbia. 

Esquimalt may also refer to:

 CFB Esquimalt, a Canadian Forces naval base, originally the Royal Navy's Pacific Station headquarters
 Esquimalt Royal Navy Dockyard or Esquimalt Station (1842–1905)
 , a Bangor-class minesweeper from World War II
 Esquimalt Harbour, a body of water flanked by the District of Esquimalt, the Town of View Royal, and the City of Colwood
 Esquimalt First Nation, a First Nations band government
 Esquimalt people, signatories to the Douglas Treaties as the Whyomilth
 Esquimalt (electoral district), a defunct provincial electoral district
 Esquimalt Airport (CYPF), a former airport
 Esquimalt railway station

See also

MV Queen of Esquimalt, Victoria-class ferry
Eskimo (disambiguation)